The History of Rock 'n' Roll is a ten episode television documentary mini-series produced by Time-Life. It originally aired on the Prime Time Entertainment Network from March to May in 1995. All parts were later released on VHS, DVD, and reran on TLC and VH1, the latter which showed all ten parts in the last 10 weeks of the year 1999 on Friday night as part of a countdown to the year 2000. 
The series covers Rock Music from the 1950s to the 1990s and features over 200 exclusive interviews with many well-known artists and other music industry figures.

Coincidentally in the same year as "The History of Rock 'n' Roll" first screened another 10-part documentary series, "Rock & Roll" (aka "Dancing in the Street" in the UK), was co-produced for PBS and the BBC, and which also covered the background of rock music.

Episodes

See also
 Rock & Roll (aka Dancing in the Street), a 1995 television documentary series, also about the history of rock music, co-produced for PBS and the BBC
 Seven Ages of Rock, 2007 series produced by the BBC and VH1 Classic

References

External links 
 

1995 American television series debuts
1995 American television series endings
1990s American television miniseries
Prime Time Entertainment Network
Rockumentaries
Rock music television series